In sixteen years, Pope Pius XI created 76 cardinals in 17 consistories. Though he created 18  cardinals at a consistory in 1935, he typically created very few cardinals at one time, holding small, frequent consistories, some of them less than six months apart. He held a consistory in 1929 to create just one cardinal, and created just two on eight occasions.

Of his appointments to the College of Cardinals, 43 were Italians. He appeared to strive to maintain an equilibrium between Italians and non-Italians and two of his consistories produced an equal division between the two groups, in March 1924 and December 1927. Non-Italians formed a majority of the College for several months in 1925 and again from 1928 to 1933. This balance reflected concerns about the independence of the Holy See and Italy during Benedict's papacy, and their new relationship established with the Lateran Treaty in 1929.

At its largest during his papacy, in December 1935, the College had 68 members, two short of the maximum size of 70 set by Pope Sixtus V in 1586. In 1927 he accepted a cardinal's resignation, the only one to occur in the 20th century. The cardinals he created included one future pope, Pope Pius XII.

11 December 1922

Pius created eight cardinals at his first consistory, which six of them attended. Reig, Archbishop of Toledo, received his red hat from the King of Spain, and Locatelli, Papal Nuncio to Portugal, from the President of the Portuguese Republic. In the case of Reig y Casanova, a widower, Pius ignored the rule established in 1585 by Pope Sixtus V that no one who had been married could be made a cardinal. Father Ehrle, a Jesuit who had served as Vatican Archivist for several years, initially declined the honor, but relented after a private meeting with Pius.

23 May 1923
Pius added two Italian cardinals on 23 May 1923.

20 December 1923
Pius created two Italian cardinals on 20 December 1923, both longtime officials in the Roman Curia.

24 March 1924
Pius named a pair of American archbishops cardinals on 24 March 1924. This brought the membership of the College of Cardinals to a total of 66, 33 Italians and 33 non-Italians: seven French, seven German, four American, four Spanish, two English, two Polish, and one each of Belgian, Hungarian, Irish, Portuguese, Brazilian, Dutch, and Canadian.

30 March 1925
Pius named a pair of Spanish archbishops cardinals on 30 March 1925. Both received their red birettas in Madrid from King Alfonso in a ceremony that included an address by the King in Latin.

The previous consistory had left the College with 33 Italians and 33 non-Italians. The deaths of the Irish Michael Logue on 19 November and the Italian Oreste Giorgi on 24 December maintained that balance. This consistory gave the non-Italians a majority of 34 to 32.

14 December 1925

Pius named four cardinals on 14 December 1925, three Italians (two diplomats and a curia official), and an Irish archbishop. He made an exception to the 1917 Code of Canon Law that prohibited cardinals from being closely related to one another. The new cardinal Enrico Gasparri was the nephew of Cardinal Secretary of State Pietro Gasparri.

The previous consistory had left the non-Italians with a 34 to 32 majority that had fallen by one with the death of Canadian Louis-Nazaire Bégin on 18 July 1925. This consistory restored the Italian majority once again.

21 June 1926
Pius named two new cardinals on 21 June 1926, both Italian curia officials.

20 December 1926
On 6 December 1926, Pius announced he would create two cardinals at a consistory on 20 December. Both were Italians, one the Bishop of Turin and the other a papal nuncio.

20 June 1927

On 2 May 1927, Pius announced he would create two cardinals at a consistory on 20 June. Both were Archbishops, one Belgian and one Polish.

19 December 1927

At this consistory Pius announced that he had accepted the resignation of French Jesuit theologian Louis Billot from the College of Cardinals, as reported in September. It was the only resignation from the College in the 20th century. Pius X had named him a cardinal in 1911.

With the creation of five non-Italian cardinals at this consistory, the College again reached a numerical balance with 33 Italians and 33 non-Italians.

15 July 1929
The deaths of several Italians altered the balance in the College by 31 March 1929 to 26 Italians and 33 non-Italians. It was rumored that Pius would appoint more non-Italians once the Holy See reached an agreement with the government of Italy about the legal status of the Vatican City State. Pius named Alfredo Schuster, an Italian of German-Swiss heritage, Archbishop of Milan and made him a cardinal on 15 July 1929.

16 December 1929

In advance of this consistory, New York Times correspondent Arnaldo Coresi speculated whether Pius would restore an Italian majority in the College of Cardinals in deference to Italian sensibilities following the ratification of the Lateran Treaty between Italy and the Holy See earlier in the year which the election of a non-Italian pope might disturb. The contrary argument was that creating a non-Italian majority in the College would demonstrate papal independence and allay fears that the Treaty gave Italy undue influence in Church affairs. Pius divided his appointments evenly: three from Italy, and one each from France, Ireland, and Portugal. The consistory left the Italians in the minority, with 30 out of 63 members.

30 June 1930
At this consistory Pius made three Italian officials of the Roman Curia, a Brazilian archbishop, and a French bishop cardinals. It left the College balanced between 31 Italians and 32 non-Italians.

13 March 1933
After creating cardinals at thirteen consistories in less than eight years, Pius waited longer than ever before to hold his next consistory in March 1933, more than two years and eight months. He nevertheless brought the membership of the College from 52 to just 58 by naming six cardinals: four Italians, an Austrian, and a Canadian. This gave the Italians a majority in College for the first time in several years. Pius announced he was making two additional prelates cardinals but withheld their names, which the press speculated meant they were too important in their present posts to be transferred from positions not normally held by a cardinal.

Cardinals in pectore

16 December 1935

On 21 November 1935, Pope Pius named 18 prelates he planned to make cardinals at a consistory on 16 December. Thirteen were Italians and five came from other countries. One of them was the first Eastern Rite patriarch to enter the College since 1895. It was the first consistory to create as many as 18 cardinals since Pius X did so in 1911. Pius also revealed the names of two he added secretly in 1933. Four of the new cardinals, papal nuncios unable to attend the ceremony, participated in the next reception of new cardinals in June 1936. As was traditional for the Apostolic Nuncio to Spain, Tedeschini, created in pectore at the previous consistory, received his red biretta from Spanish President Alcalá Zaomora, head of "one of the most officially anti-clerical nations in the world". With this consistory the College grew to 68 members, 37 of them Italians.

15 June 1936

Both new cardinals had spent years in various positions at the Vatican Library, where Pius himself had worked early in his career.

13 December 1937
Pius' health had been so poor that on 21 December 1936 the U.S. weekly magazine Life published picture of the 66 cardinals then living with the advice: "Disregard non-Italians and old men: somewhere among the others is the face of the next Pope." A year later, Pius reminded those assembled at a consistory held in December 1937 that it might be his last. With the appointment of 3 Italians and 2 non-Italians at his last consistory, Pius increased the Italians to 39 out of 60 members of the College of Cardinals.

Notes

References

Additional sources

External links

Pius XI
Cardinals created by Pope Pius XI
20th-century Catholicism
Pope Pius XI
College of Cardinals
 
1922 in Christianity
1923 in Christianity
1924 in Christianity
1925 in Christianity
1926 in Christianity
1927 in Christianity
1929 in Christianity
1930 in Christianity
1933 in Christianity
1935 in Christianity
1936 in Christianity
1937 in Christianity